Thomas Rees may refer to:

Religious figures
 Thomas Rees (Congregational minister) (1815–1885), Welsh Congregationalist minister
  (1869–1926), Welsh theologian and editor, principal of Bala-Bangor Independent College, see 1926 in Wales
 Thomas Rees (Unitarian) (1777–1864), Welsh Unitarian minister and scholar

Sportspeople
 Tom Rees (rugby union, born 1913) (1913–1991), Welsh international rugby union prop
 Tommy Rees (American football) (born 1992), American football quarterback
 Tom Rees (rugby union, born 1984), rugby union footballer of the 2000 and 2010s for England, and London Wasps
 Tommy Rees (rugby) (1904–1968), rugby union and rugby league footballer of the 1920s and 1930s

Military figures
 Tom Rees (RFC officer) (1895–1916), first man killed by the "Red Baron"
 Thomas Wynford Rees (1898–1959), British Indian Army general

Others
 T. Ifor Rees (Thomas Ifor Rees, 1890–1977), Welsh diplomat and translator
 Thomas M. Rees (1925–2003), U.S. Representative from California
 Thomas Rees (Twm Carnabwth) (1806–1876), Welsh leader of the Rebecca Riots, also known as Twm Carnabwth
 Tom Rees, physician and co-founder of AMREF  
 Tom Rees (evangelist) (1911–1970), English evangelist
 Thomas ap Rees (1930–1996), botanist
 Thomas Rees (mayor) (1844–1921), master builder and mayor of Brisbane, Queensland, Australia

See also
 Thomas J. Reese (born 1945), Jesuit author